The earless skinks form the genus Hemiergis in the skink family Scincidae.  All earless skinks are native to Australia.

Species
There are seven species:
 Hemiergis decresiensis (Cuvier, 1829) — three-toed earless skink
 Hemiergis gracilipes (Steindachner, 1870) — south-western mulch-skink
 Hemiergis initialis (Werner, 1910) — southwestern earless skink
 Hemiergis millewae Coventry, 1976 — Triodia earless skink
 Hemiergis peronii (Gray, 1831) — four-toed earless skink, Peron's earless skink, or lowlands earless skink
 Hemiergis quadrilineatus (Duméril & Bibron, 1839) — two-toed earless skink
 Hemiergis talbingoensis (Copland, 1946) — eastern three-toed earless skink

Two additional species, H. graciloides and H. maccoyi, have been included in this genus but both are now classified in other genera.

References

Hemiergis
Endemic fauna of Australia
Skinks of Australia
Taxa named by Johann Georg Wagler